Aechmea fasciata is a species of flowering plant in the Bromeliaceae family. It is commonly called the silver vase or urn plant and is native to Brazil. This plant is probably the best known species in this genus, and it is often grown as a houseplant in temperate areas.

Description

Growing conditions
Aechmea fasciata requires partial shade and a well-drained, but moisture-retentive soil. It can also be grown epiphytically, as, for example, with moss around its roots and wired to rough bark. Root rot can be a problem if the soil is too moist. If potted, the soil should contain ample acidic organic matter. The rosette formed by the leaves should be kept filled with water. Propagation is from side shoots that naturally develop around the base of the main rosette.

Scale insects and mosquitos will sometimes breed in the pools of water that are trapped between the leaves.

Toxicity
Aechmea fasciata is listed in the FDA Poisonous Plant Database under the section for "Skin irritating substances in plants" and is known to cause contact dermititis, phytophoto dermatitis, and contact allergy.

Cultivars

References

BSI Cultivar Registry Retrieved 11 October 2009

External links

 

fasciata
Flora of Brazil
Epiphytes
House plants
Taxa named by John Gilbert Baker
Taxa named by John Lindley